Come Up Smiling (also known as Ants in His Pants) is a 1939 Australian comedy film starring popular American stage comedian Will Mahoney and his wife Evie Hayes. It was the only feature from Cinesound Productions not directed by Ken G. Hall.

Synopsis
Barney O'Hara is a performer in a touring carnival. He runs a sideshow act with his daughter, Pat, and ex-Shakespearean actor, Horace Worthington Howard, which is struggling to make money. One of the main attractions is Pat's voice.

One day Pat is invited to sing at a party held by Colonel Cameron and his daughter Eve, but her voice fails her. A specialist tells Barney that Pat requires an expensive operation.

To raise the money, Barney agrees to fight a boxer known as 'The Killer'. He is helped in his training by dancer Kitty Katkin. On the day of the fight, ants are slipped into Barney's shorts, causing him to defeat the Killer. He wins the money to enable Pat to have her operation.

Cast

Production
The film was developed as a star vehicle for popular comedian Will Mahoney, an American vaudevillian who toured Australia successfully in 1938. Ken G. Hall also hired Mahoney's regular co-stars, his wife Evie Hayes and manager, Bob Geraghty. Hall hoped that Mahoney's appeal would help the film outside Australia:
This is the most important contract that has been signed at Cinesound as Mahoney is the highest paid star we have ever signed up. In fact, I think he's the highest paid stage artist ever to have toured Australia. It is only the improved conditions of the Australian film industry, due to recent legislation, that has made it possible for us to enlarge our production budget. If any artist can carry an Australian film to overseas markets, it's Will Mahoney.

Mahoney later said, "I think I'll be a big success in this film, but don't get me wrong. It's only because I'm playing myself and I feel I know me pretty well."

It was the only film from Cinesound Productions not directed by Hall. The writer-director, William Freshman, was born in Australia but had been working in the British film industry. Freshman was hired along with his wife, scriptwriter Lydia Hayward, to give Hall time to prepare for other projects.

"We are now planning bigger things, as we are well able to do, by reason of the additional time at my disposal", said Hall at the time. "Opportunity will be taken to find big subjects from which to make big pictures – like Robbery Under Arms, which I expect to direct personally, Overland Telegraph, Eureka Stockade, and others of that calibre, though not all necessarily historic." (None of these movies ended up being made.)

The Freshmans arrived in Australia in April 1939 and the script was ready by June. Hall later wrote that Freshman "seemed to lack the vital comedy sense we needed, but he was a good constructor in a general way of screenplay writing. The boxing ring sequence was, I think, one of the funniest things we did at Cinesound."

The romantic leads were played by Cinesound regular Shirley Ann Richards and John Fleeting. Fleeting had previously appeared in Gone to the Dogs (1939). Singing star Jean Hatton appeared in her second movie, after Mr. Chedworth Steps Out (1938).

The film was the first starring future Australian filmstar Chips Rafferty (as an uncredited extra).

Shooting
The movie was mostly shot at Cinesound's Bondi studios, with carnival scenes filmed at the Sydney Showground. An estimated 16,000 extras were used.

During filming, Jean Hatton was injured falling down two flights of stairs but managed to recover.

Adolph Zukor of Paramount visited the set during filming. He had seen Dad and Dave Come to Town on the boat out to Australia and was so impressed by its quality that he asked to visit Cinesound. Zukor watched Hall direct a sequence of Come Up Smiling and told reporters, "I watched that director at work and he certainly seems to be fully conversant with film technique. I've been pleasantly surprised with what I have seen to-day. I didn't expect to find anything like the facilities that this studio possesses. I would say that Clnesound is just as good as anything we have to Hollywood."

Reception
The film was not an immediate success at the box office so Hall had it re-cut and re-released as Ants in His Pants, adding a new song to explain the title. The movie performed much better on re-release.

Reviews were mediocre.

References

External links

Come Up Smiling at Oz Movies
Come Up Smiling at AustLit

1939 films
Films directed by Ken G. Hall
Australian black-and-white films
Australian musical comedy films
1939 musical comedy films
1930s English-language films
1930s Australian films
Cinesound Productions films